Mohamed Camara may refer to:
Mady Camara (born 1997), Guinean football midfielder who plays in Greece
Mo Camara (born 1975), Guinean football defender who played in France, England, and Scotland
Mohamed Ali Camara (born 1997), Guinean football defender who plays in Switzerland
Mohamed Almamy Camara (born 1996), Guinean football forward who plays in Austria
Mohamed Camara (film director) (born 1959), Guinean film director based in France
Mohamed Camara (footballer, born 1980), Guinean football midfielder who played in Belgium and Greece
Mohamed Camara (footballer, born 1981), Sierra Leonean football midfielder who played in Russia
Mohamed Camara (footballer, born 1982), Guinean football midfielder who played in Guinea, Algeria, and Moldova
Mohamed Camara (footballer, born 1987), Malian football defender who plays in Mali
Mohamed Camara (footballer, born 1989), Guinean football midfielder who played in Guinea and Morocco
Mohamed Camara (footballer, born 1990), Guinean football forward who plays in France
Mohamed Camara (footballer, born 1999), Guinean football defender who plays in Guinea
Mohamed Camara (footballer, born March 2000), Guinean football goalkeeper who plays in Guinea
Mohamed Camara (footballer, born January 2000), Malian football midfielder who plays in Austria
Mohamed Lamine Camara (born 1986), Guinean football forward who played in Guinea and France
Mohamed Marko Camara (born 1985), Guinean football forward who played in Guinea, Tunisia, and Algeria
Mohamed Saliou Camara (born 1996), Guinean football midfielder who plays in Guinea
Mohamed Sorel Camara (born 1997), Guinean football midfielder who plays in France
Mohamed Tawal Camara (born 1976), Guinean football defender who played in Hungary
Yali-Yali (Mohamed Camara, born 1985), Guinean footballer who played in Belgium

See also
Mohamed Kamara (disambiguation)